"Time's Orphan" is the 148th episode of the syndicated American science fiction television series Star Trek: Deep Space Nine, the 24th episode of the sixth season.

Set in the 24th century, the series follows the adventures on Deep Space Nine, a space station located near a stable wormhole between the Alpha and Gamma quadrants of the Milky Way Galaxy. In this episode, young Molly O'Brien (Hana Hatae) falls into an alien time portal and is rescued ten years older as a feral 18-year-old. Michelle Krusiec guest stars as time-portal Molly.

Aired on television the week of May 18, 1998, it received Nielsen ratings of 4.6 points corresponding to about 4.5 million viewers.

Plot

Miles and Keiko O'Brien (Colm Meaney and Rosalind Chao) take their children to the planet Golana for a picnic. While playing, eight-year-old Molly (Hana Hatae) falls into an abandoned time portal, which closes after Molly passes through. It sends her 300 years into the past, to a time when the planet was uninhabited. The crew of Deep Space Nine helps the O'Briens recover Molly, using transporter technology to lock onto her signal once they are able to open the portal again. However, they find the portal has opened at a different time, and the Molly they rescue is now 18 years old and feral after having survived on her own for ten years in the planet's past. Molly is brought back to the station, and placed in a special habitat made to resemble the planet, to allow the O'Briens to try to reconnect with their daughter.

Molly slowly comes to remember her parents, but still is barely controllable and confined to the boundaries of the habitat. She asks her parents to take her "home", but when they bring her back to their apartment she makes it clear that she means she wants to be returned to Golana. Her parents take her to a simulation of Golana in a holosuite, to which she responds positively; but when the simulation is deactivated, Molly becomes violent. Starfleet informs the O'Briens that it plans to put Molly into a mental institution, a situation that neither Miles nor Keiko believes is ideal for Molly. With help from a sympathetic Odo (René Auberjonois), Miles and Keiko return Molly to the portal on Golana, with the intention of destroying it to prevent Starfleet from finding her. After Miles and Keiko say their goodbyes, Molly returns through the portal but encounters her younger self, only a short time after she had fallen through. The older Molly points her younger self back through the portal; as soon as the younger Molly passes through, the older Molly disappears. Molly reappears moments before Miles is about to destroy the portal, and the family happily reunites.

In a side plot, Jadzia Dax (Terry Farrell) offers to look after Molly's one-year-old brother Yoshi; her husband Worf (Michael Dorn) volunteers to care for the child, hoping to prove his parenting skills to Dax. When Yoshi bumps his head, Worf condemns himself as an unfit parent, but he is mollified when Dax tells him that the O'Briens said that Yoshi has bumped his head many times before and later tells him that Yoshi has happily learned one of the Klingon games Worf taught him.

Production

The outdoor shots of the exoplanet the O'Brien's visit, later recreated in the holosuite, were filmed at Malibu Creek State Park in California.  The nature park is in the Santa Monica Mountains of that region, on the west coast of the continental United States.  According to the Deep Space Nine Companion the rocks for the "stonehenge" were fiberglass props.

The melon from Golana that the O'Briens feed Molly was an actual fruit, the kiwano (Cucumis metuliferus) which has a yellowish exterior and green interior.

Special effects are used for a Danube-class Runabout above Golana.

Reception
Keith DeCandido of Tor.com rated the episode 4 out of 10.

A 2015 binge-watching guide for Star Trek: Deep Space Nine by Wired recommended skipping this episode.

See also

 Disaster (Star Trek: The Next Generation) (Molly is born on the Enterprise 1701D)
 Feral child

References

External links

 

Star Trek: Deep Space Nine (season 6) episodes
1998 American television episodes
Star Trek time travel episodes